Anja Garbarek (born 24 July 1970 in Oslo, Norway) is a Norwegian singer-songwriter. She was raised in Oslo.

Career 
Garbarek's debut album, Velkommen Inn (1992), is sung in Norwegian. She subsequently released three original albums containing English lyrics: Balloon Mood (1996), Smiling and Waving (co-produced by Steven Wilson; 2001), and Briefly Shaking (2006). She received the Spellemannsprisen in 2001 for her album Smiling & Waving in the open class category. She was also responsible for the soundtrack to Luc Besson's 2005 film Angel-A, which included music from her albums as well as several new songs composed specifically for the film.

Garbarek collaborated with Mark Hollis of Talk Talk on two of her tracks for the 2001 album Smiling & Waving.

Personal life 
Raised in Oslo, Garbarek is the daughter of the Norwegian jazz saxophonist Jan Garbarek.

Garbarek is married to John Mallison, with whom she has one daughter, Emily.

Discography

Albums 
 Velkommen inn (1992)
 Balloon Mood (1996)
 Smiling & Waving (2001)
 Briefly Shaking (2005)
 Angel-A Soundtrack (2005)
 The Road Is Just a Surface (2018)

Guest appearances 
Volcano – Satyricon – (2002) (voices on 3 songs: "Angstridden", "Mental Mercury" and "Black Lava")
Koine – Rita Marcotulli (2003)
Cuckooland – Robert Wyatt (2003)
Sweet Mental – Wibutee (2006) (voice on 1 song: "The Ball")
Comicopera – Robert Wyatt (2007)
Slope – Steve Jansen (2008) (voice on 1 song: "Cancelled Pieces")
4 Remixes from Slope – Steve Jansen (2008) (voice on 1 song: "Pieces Cancelled (Cancelled Pieces Remix)")

References

External links

Radiodokumentaren: " – så smeller det" 23.08.2014 on NRK (in Norwegian)
2019 interview with Innerviews (In English)

1970 births
Living people
Norwegian songwriters
Trip hop musicians
English-language singers from Norway
Spellemannprisen winners
Norwegian people of Polish descent
Norwegian women in electronic music
21st-century Norwegian women singers
21st-century Norwegian singers